James Stuart, 2nd Earl of Bute (before 1696 – 28 January 1723) was the son of James Stuart, 1st Earl of Bute and Agnes Mackenzie.

Family
In February 1711, he married Lady Anne Campbell (daughter of Archibald Campbell, 1st Duke of Argyll and Elizabeth Tollemache) and had eight children:

John Stuart, 3rd Earl of Bute (25 May 1713 – 10 March 1792)
James Stuart-Mackenzie (b. before 1723 – c. April 1800)
Hon. Archibald Stuart
Lady Mary Stuart (b. c1713, d. 30 December 1773) married 31 October 1729 to Sir Robert Menzies of Weem (b. c1706, d. 1786)
Lady Elizabeth Stuart
Lady Anne Stuart (b. before 1723 – 28 November 1786), married July 1736 James Johnstone (later Ruthven, 5th Lord Ruthven of Freeland)
Lady Jean Stuart
Lady Grace Stuart

On his death his wife remarried to Alexander Fraser, Lord Strichen.

References

17th-century births
1723 deaths
Earls of Bute
Scottish representative peers
Parents of prime ministers of the United Kingdom